Stalin's first government was created on 7 May 1941 and was dissolved on 15 March 1946, with the creation of Stalin's second government. It was the government throughout the Great Patriotic War.

Ministries
The government consisted of:

Some periods in the table below start before 7 May 1941 or end after 15 March 1946 because the minister was in previous or later governments.

Committees

References 

Soviet governments
1941 establishments in the Soviet Union
1946 disestablishments